Sparganopseustis myrota is a species of moth of the family Tortricidae. It is found in Colombia and Carchi Province, Ecuador.

References

Moths described in 1912
Sparganothini